Minsc  is a fictional character in the Baldur's Gate series of Dungeons & Dragons role-playing video games developed by BioWare. He originated from the pen-and-paper Dungeons & Dragons sessions held by the lead designer of Baldur's Gate, James Ohlen, and was expanded upon by the game's lead writer, Lukas Kristjanson. His video game debut was in Baldur's Gate as a companion character who can join the player's party. He also appears in the sequel, Baldur's Gate II: Shadows of Amn, the expansion, Baldur's Gate II: Throne of Bhaal, and the 2015 game Baldur's Gate: Siege of Dragonspear, as well as in promotions relating to the titles. Minsc is voiced by Jim Cummings in his video game appearances.

In the storyline, Minsc is a ranger, originally tasked with serving as a bodyguard to the witch Dynaheir as part of a "dajemma" (rite of passage). When Dynaheir is captured by gnolls, Minsc asks the player to help free her, after which both characters are available to assist the player. Eventually, the player's party is captured and when Dynaheir is killed by the mage Jon Irenicus, Minsc teams with the player in the pursuit of justice. A berserker, he has a strong desire to uphold good and be heroic, though with an extreme fervor that causes those around him to regard him as possibly insane. His animal companion is a miniature giant space hamster named Boo, with whom he often consults.

Since his introduction, Minsc has been regarded as one of the best and most popular elements of the Baldur's Gate games because of his demeanor and attachment to Boo, according to reviewers from IGN, GameSpot, and Eurogamer. Other reviewers from publications such as CVG have regarded him as one of the greatest aspects of PC gaming, while game developers have noted a preference for him. The web comic Megatokyo added Boo as a character in their publication, while Largo (for whom Boo serves in the comic as his long-suffering conscience) took on aspects of Minsc. His absence from subsequent gaming titles has also been lamented by several publications.

Conception and creation

Minsc and Boo originated in pen and paper Dungeons & Dragons sessions held by the lead designer of Baldur's Gate, James Ohlen. Played by Cameron Tofer, associate producer and lead programmer of MDK2, Minsc was conceived as an unstable comic relief ranger who carried around a pet hamster named Boo in the Dark Sun campaign setting. The lead writer for Baldur's Gate, Lukas Kristjanson, expanded upon the character and created dialogue intended to make Minsc funny and memorable to the general audience. During development, some of the character's lines were rewritten based on the voice actor's readings. As this progressed, the writers noted they were able to interject dialogue more freely for Minsc into the script in a tone suitable for the character. In a 2001 interview, BioWare co-founder Ray Muzyka has stated that among the titles the company has completed, Minsc was his favorite character.

Minsc classifies Boo a "miniature giant space hamster", a creature first mentioned in the Dungeons & Dragons Spelljammer campaign setting which describes them as giant hamsters bred to paddle wheels for flying ships, which can alternatively be bred in miniature form, looking like a normal hamster. Senior designer David Gaider noted that regardless of what Boo was called, Boo had no powers or abilities beyond those of a regular hamster. He also noted that Boo was handled differently from other creatures that served as familiars that would fight alongside their owners, because of the frailty of hamsters and the impact Boo's dying would have on Minsc in the game. In an open discussion with BioWare developers, scriptwriter Drew Karpyshyn described Boo's role in the game as "[providing] wisdom and moral support to Minsc".

Appearances

Baldur's Gate video game series
In Baldur's Gate, Minsc is a bald, purple-tattooed ranger from the Forgotten Realms country of Rashemen. Originally a berserker on his "dajemma", a rite of passage to gain entrance to the Ice Dragon Berserker Lodge, he makes an oath to guard the witch Dynaheir, but runs into trouble when he and Dynaheir are ambushed by gnolls, who capture Dynaheir at their stronghold. He orders the player to halt so that Boo may judge them, and requests that the player help him. Following Dynaheir's rescue, the player is given an option to add Minsc and Dynaheir to the party that will eventually fight the main antagonist Sarevok.

At the beginning of Shadows of Amn, the player's party is captured and imprisoned by the mage Jon Irenicus, who seeks to tap into the player's power for his own goals. Dynaheir has been slain, so Minsc offers his services to avenge her. Depending on the player's choices, it is possible Minsc adopts a new witch in the party; if he does, and the new witch is downed in battle, Minsc goes berserk. In Throne of Bhaal, Minsc is a character that can be summoned to assist the player. In the game's epilogue, it is revealed that Minsc has returned to Rashemen and has gained access to the Ice Dragon Berserker Lodge, having become a renowned hero due to his experiences with the player. He forms his own adventuring company, the Justice Fist, where he continues to fight evil. In his later years, he journeys across the Realms and disappears.

Larian Studios, developers for the upcoming 2023 sequel Baldur's Gate III, have confirmed that Matt Mercer will be the voice of Minsc.

Baldur's Gate novelization
Minsc is a supporting character in the 2000 novelization of Baldur's Gate II: Shadows of Amn by Philip Athans. He is depicted as a well-built man with long red hair, a patchy orange beard, and a jagged scar along the right side of his head. He is no longer a warrior, and is physically smaller than the novel's protagonist, Abdel. In contrast, Boo is unchanged, and is still referred to by Minsc as his miniature giant space hamster. Held prisoner alongside Abdel at the start of the novel, Minsc is set free and accompanies Abdel until they reach an inn, where he decides to work. Abdel repeatedly shows discomfort for his presence, using Minsc's employment as an excuse to leave him behind and steal his sword, though he later returns for his help in securing travel aboard a ship. After Abdel returns to kill his employers, Minsc realizes the inn will close permanently; he and Boo leave to find another place to work.

Neverwinter MMO 
In February 2015 it was announced that Minsc and Boo will appear in Elemental Evil, a module to the 2013 massively multiplayer online role-playing game Neverwinter. The module was released on March 17, 2015.

Megatokyo

Boo appears in the webcomic Megatokyo, where he wears strapped-on wings and serves as Largo's conscience, although he is often misunderstood as he only squeaks. Largo adapts Minsc's personality, including his catchphrase, saying "Go for the beer, Boo!" In number 121, Boo leaves Largo but is unable to get his old job back at BioWare.

BioWare's Ray Muzyka praised Boo's appearance in the comic, describing it as an "anime-style" depiction of a favorite character. For a limited time Boo plush toys modeled after his appearance in the comic were sold by the artists through the website, though production was initially delayed due to manufacturing errors.

Battle for Baldur's Gate - Dungeon Mayhem Expansion Pack 
In September 2019 Dungeon Mayhem, a Dungeons & Dragons inspired card game, released its first expansion pack entitled Battle for Baldur's Gate. The box contains two character card sets, with one featuring Jaheira and the other with Minsc and Boo.

References in other media
Though they do not return in other Baldur's Gate titles, Minsc and Boo have also been referenced by non-BioWare games and media. In Dragon Age: Origins, the loading screen sometimes displays the advice "If all else fails, go for the eyes". In Dragon Age Legends, random NPC's use "Go for the eyes!" as a battle cry. In Neverwinter Nights 2: Mask of the Betrayer, an "Astral Rodent totem" can be found, with the words "For M" carved on it. In Mass Effect 2, a "space hamster" is available for purchase. It gives the player a "knowing smile" when observed. One of the game's non-playable characters, Tali, shouts "Go for the optics!" to her combat drone. In Mass Effect 3 Citadel DLC, Commander Shepard finds their hamster being thrown out by one of their foes, and tells the hamster "Sit tight, little guy. If anyone gives you trouble, go for the eyes!"  In Guild Wars Nightfall, "Go for the eyes!" is the name of a shout command skill used by the Paragon class.

In July 2014 a comic Dungeons & Dragons: Legends of Baldur’s Gate was announced for October 2014 release. It's set generations after Throne of Bhaal and features Minsc as the main character. It's written by Jim Zub and pencilled by Max Dunbar. It's part of the Dungeons & Dragons 40th anniversary celebrations.

On March 8, 2015 at PAX East in Boston, Massachusetts, Minsc was used as an NPC "intern" of the player characters in the "Acquisitions Incorporated" celebrity Dungeons & Dragons session, to the apparent delight of players Jerry Holkins and Patrick Rothfuss.

In March, 2015, Wizkids provided a limited edition promotional card and die of Minsc and Boo as part of their Dungeons & Dragons Dice Masters set Battle for Faerûn.

In July 2017, Wizkids released their seventh D&D Icons of the Realms miniature sets, which features a miniature of Minsc (with Boo sitting on his shoulders) as a Medium-sized and of 'Rare' rarity rating piece of the set.

In the 2017 game Torment: Tides of Numenera, the player can, under certain circumstances obtain a rodentlike creature named Bao which grants one fighting bonuses at the expense of intelligence, along with an ability to blind enemies.

In July 2021, Minsc was depicted on a Magic: The Gathering trading card in the Dungeons & Dragons themed set Adventures in the Forgotten Realms.

Promotion
In an interview with GameSpy, Lukas Kristjanson acted as Minsc as he gave details about his character background. When asked about the possibility of Minsc and Boo making cameo appearances later BioWare titles, Baldur's Gate II: Throne of Bhaal lead developer Kevin Martens stated "Well, Minsc is popular. You like Minsc. We like Minsc. Neverwinter is so far away. That is all that I have to say."

Reception
Dan Tudge, project lead for Dragon Age: Origins, noted that prior to working for BioWare he would rush home after work to use the character. UGO.com described Minsc as "a beloved game personality", and lamented the absence of similar characters in later BioWare titles. IGN named Minsc's return in Baldur's Gate II as an aspect of the game they looked forward to, stating "How can you live without Minsc?!" Computer Games Magazine called him the favorite character of many players of the original Baldur's Gate, citing his strengths and "appealing personality" as reasons for his popularity. Calling him "everyone's favorite lovable oaf", they praised his early presence in the game's sequel. Minsc placed seventh in a "Reader's Choice" edition of GameSpot's "Ten Best Sidekicks", which noted that the character's demeanor and attachment to Boo as reasons for his appeal. Eurogamer named Minsc the best male supporting character in video games for 2001, noting him as additionally one of the most popular characters of the original Baldur's Gate.

CVG listed him as one of their two-hundred reasons to "Love PC Gaming", quoting one of his battle cries ("Go for the eyes, Boo!") for their reasoning. He was listed by MSN Entertainment as one of the "Gaming's unsung heroes", saying he "provides great comic relief and is a fondly remembered man."  GameDaily named him one of the Most Lovable Lummoxes in video gaming, stating "Every good party of adventurers in a CRPG needs a tank...In Baldur's Gate, the human ranger Minsc is that tank, and a valuable asset to the player's quest." Dakota Grabowski of GameZone listed Minsc as the top BioWare created teammate, commenting "His voice-acting was hands-down one of the best attributes of the Baldur's Gate series" and that "BioWare will never surpass their creation of Minsc (and Boo!).". Kimberley Wallace of Game Informer considered him to be one of the best BioWare characters, saying "If you played Baldur's Gate, one character stood out from the pack. ... Strangely enough, this is what makes you love him all the more." In 2011, Empire ranked him and Boo as the 11th greatest video game character, adding that "Few names bring a wistful smile to the faces of aging PC gamers like that of Minsc and his trusty hamster companion". GamesTM named Minsc one of BioWare's 8 most memorable companion characters. Andy Kelly from PC Gamer named Minsc as his personal favourite BioWare companion, commenting "Minsc is not as rich or nuanced as many of BioWare's more recent creations, but he makes up for it with sheer personality". In a 2017 article, PC Gamer staff included Minsc in their definitive list of the best RPG squad mates around.

Notes

References

Further reading

External links

 MegaTokyo Boo plush toy

Baldur's Gate
BioWare characters
Fantasy video game characters
Fictional bodyguards in video games
Forgotten Realms characters
Male characters in video games
Video game characters introduced in 1998
Video game sidekicks